Edward Edson Lee (September 2, 1884 – September 28, 1944), who wrote under the pen name of Leo Edwards, was a popular children's literature author in the 1920s and 1930s.

Biography 

Lee had a difficult childhood, dropping out of school to go to work in his early teens.  He got his start as a writer writing serialized stories, most notably in The American Boy magazine.  His first book, Andy Blake in Advertising, was published in 1922 (reprinted in 1928 as the first volume in the Andy Blake series).

He wrote five series of books: the Jerry Todd series of sixteen books; the Poppy Ott series of eleven books; the Trigger Berg series of four books; the Andy Blake series of four books; and the Tuffy Bean series of four books. All of the series were interrelated in some way; the Todd and Ott stories took place in the town of Tutter, Illinois, a fictional town modeled on the town of Utica, which Lee experienced in his childhood.  The supporting characters in the Todd and Ott books — "Red" Meyers, "Scoop" Ellery, and "Peg" Shaw — were real boys that Lee befriended around the time he began writing the stories while living in Shelby, Ohio.

Edward Edson Lee is buried in Beloit, Wisconsin.

Legacy 
Initially forgotten after his death, Lee's books (most of them graced by the gaudy and idiosyncratic illustrations of Bert Salg) have become highly valued by juvenile book collectors.

The end of each Jerry Todd book had the unusual feature of printed letters from readers and Lee's warm, informal responses to them. This tradition — and intimate tone — was later imitated by Marvel Comics editor/publisher Stan Lee (no relation) in the "Marvel Bullpen Bulletins" pages printed in the pages of all Marvel comics.

The 1990s power pop band Cockeyed Ghost took its name from one of Edwards' more obscure books, Trigger Berg and the Cock-Eyed Ghost.

In his autobiography, "Where's the Rest of Me?" Ronald Reagan wrote that, growing up in Tampico, Illinois, he had a boyhood much like Jerry Todd.

List of works

Andy Blake series
Andy Blake (originally Andy Blake in Advertising) - 1922, republished 1928
Andy Blake's Comet Coaster - 1928
Andy Blake's Secret Service - 1929
Andy Blake and the Pot of Gold - 1930

Jerry Todd series
Jerry Todd and the Whispering Mummy - 1923
Jerry Todd and the Rose-Colored Cat - 1924
Jerry Todd and the Oak Island Treasure - 1925
Jerry Todd and the Waltzing Hen - 1924
Jerry Todd and the Talking Frog - 1925
Jerry Todd and the Purring Egg - 1925
Jerry Todd in the Whispering Cave - 1927
Jerry Todd, Pirate - 1928
Jerry Todd and the Bob-Tailed Elephant - 1929
Jerry Todd, Editor-In-Grief - 1930
Jerry Todd, Caveman - 1932
Jerry Todd and the Flying Flapdoodle - 1934
Jerry Todd and the Buffalo Bill Bathtub - 1936
Jerry Todd's Up-The-Ladder Club - 1937
Jerry Todd's Poodle Parlor - 1938
Jerry Todd's Cuckoo Camp - 1940

Poppy Ott series
Poppy Ott and the Stuttering Parrot - 1926
Poppy Ott's Seven-League Stilts - 1926
Poppy Ott and the Galloping Snail - 1927
Poppy Ott's Pedigreed Pickles - 1927
Poppy Ott and the Freckled Goldfish - 1928
Poppy Ott and the Tittering Totem - 1929
Poppy Ott and the Prancing Pancake - 1930
Poppy Ott Hits The Trail - 1933
Poppy Ott & Co., Inferior Decorators - 1937
The Monkey's Paw - 1938
The Hidden Dwarf - 1939

Trigger Berg series
Trigger Berg and the Treasure Tree - 1930
Trigger Berg and His 700 Mousetraps - 1930
Trigger Berg and the Sacred Pig - 1931
Trigger Berg and the Cock-Eyed Ghost - 1933

Tuffy Bean series
Tuffy Bean's Puppy Days - 1931
Tuffy Bean's One-Ring Circus - 1931
Tuffy Bean At Funny Bone Farm - 1931
Tuffy Bean and the Lost Fortune - 1932

References

External links

 Leo Edwards Original Home Page (archived February 2011)
 
 
 

1884 births
1944 deaths
20th-century American novelists
American children's writers
People from LaSalle County, Illinois
Writers from Rockford, Illinois
People from Shelby, Ohio